Sheen Magazine is a bimonthly magazine about African-American entertainment, music, culture, lifestyle and fashion. It was founded by Kimberly M. Chapman in 2006 as an extension of her Chapman Products Company. Its target audience is the African-American community and anyone interested in African American culture and its influence in today's world.

Each year, Sheen hosts the Kimmie Awards to honor the women whose work is an inspiration to others. Sheen covers are frequently referenced on sites like Young Black & Fabulous, Kiwi the Beauty, Bossip and Womanish.

Subjects
In August 2022, Sheen featured the Jamaican dancehall recording artist, singer and songwriter Spice.

References

External links
 
 

Magazines established in 2006
African-American magazines
Black-owned companies of the United States
Lifestyle magazines published in the United States
Bimonthly magazines published in the United States
Magazines published in North Carolina
Photojournalistic magazines